David I. Arkin (December 19, 1906 – October 8, 1980) was an American teacher, painter, writer, lyricist, and the father of actor Alan Arkin.

Early life
Arkin was born in New York, the son of Russian-Jewish immigrants.

Career 
In 1945, Arkin moved his family to Los Angeles, California to take a teaching job. Arkin attempted to obtain work in the entertainment industry, but was unsuccessful. An eight-month Hollywood strike cost Arkin a set designer job, but the greater blow was as a result of the McCarthy "witch hunt". Arkin, a leftist, was accused of being a communist but Arkin refused to answer questions regarding his political affiliation. As a result, he was fired from his teaching job and was unable to gain work in Hollywood. Arkin challenged his dismissal, but did not achieve exoneration until after his death. He died of cancer in October, 1980, at the age of 73 at his home in Silverlake, California.

Arkin's most memorable song-writing contribution was in creating the lyrics to the song "Black and White", with music by Earl Robinson in 1954. The song was written to celebrate the United States Supreme Court decision of Brown v. Board of Education striking down racial segregation in public schools.

"Black and White" has been recorded by Pete Seeger, Sammy Davis Jr, Greyhound, The Maytones and Three Dog Night. The lyric has been the basis of an illustrated book  by Arkin, which was first published in 1966. More recent editions feature a new introduction by Pete Seeger.

Personal life 
Arkin and his wife, Beatrice Wortis, had two sons, actor Alan Arkin, bass musician Bobby Arkin, and a daughter, author Bonnie Cordova.

References

External links
Songfacts: "Black and White" by Three Dog Night

1906 births
1980 deaths
Songwriters from California
20th-century American musicians
American people of Russian-Jewish descent
Jewish American songwriters
20th-century American Jews